Carbon label is a form of isotopic labeling where a carbon-12 atom has been replaced with either a carbon-13 atom or a carbon-14 atom in a chemical compound so as to 'tag' (i.e. label) that position of the compound to assist in determining the way a chemical reaction proceeds i.e. the reaction mechanism.

See also

Radiocarbon dating

Isotopes